Ejnar is a masculine given name and may refer to:

Ejnar Dyggve (1887–1961), Danish architect and archeologist
Ejnar Emborg (1888–1963), Danish composer
Ejnar Hansen (1898–1947), Danish wrestler
Ejnar Hertzsprung (1873–1967), Danish chemist and astronomer
Ejnar Jacobsen (1897–1970), Danish composer
Ejnar Martin Kjær (1893–1947), Danish politician
Ejnar Levison (1880–1970), Danish fencer
Ejnar Mikkelsen (1880–1971), Danish polar explorer and author, born in Jutland
Ejnar Nielsen (1872–1956), Danish visual artist
Ejnar Olsson (1896–1925), Swedish ice hockey player
Ejnar Mindedal Rasmussen (1892–1975), Danish architect
Ejnar Sylvest (1880–1972), Danish physician
Ejnar Tønsager (1888–1967), Norwegian rower

 Middle name
Anders Ejnar Andersen (1912–2006), Danish politician

See also
Einar
Einer (disambiguation)
Ejner

Danish masculine given names
Norwegian masculine given names
Swedish masculine given names
Scandinavian masculine given names